Ossip may refer to:

Ossip Bernstein (1882–1962), Russian chess grandmaster and a financial lawyer
Ossip Brik, also known as Osip Brik, (1888–1945), Russian avant garde writer and literary critic
Ossip Dimov, also known as Osip Dymov, the central fictional character in Grasshopper (1892) by Anton Chekhov
Ossip Gabrilowitsch (1878–1936), Russian-born American pianist, conductor and composer
Ossip Gurko, also known as Iosif Gurko, (1828–1901), Russian field marshal prominent during the Russo-Turkish War (1877–1878)
Ossip Mandelstam, also known as Osip Mandelstam, (1891–1938), Russian poet and essayist
Ossip Runitsch (1889–1947), Russian silent film actor, producer and stage director
Ossip Schubin (1854–1934), pseudonym of Austrian novelist Aloisia Kirschner
Ossip Zadkine (1890–1967), Belarusian-born artist who lived in France